Numa Lavanchy (born 25 August 1993) is a Swiss professional footballer who plays for FC Sion.

Club career
Lavanchy started his career with FC Lausanne-Sport as an academy player. At Lausanne he was able to rise through the youth ranks and actually broke into the first-team before he'd even made his reserve team debut. He made his debut for Lausanne-Sport in a Swiss Challenge League match on 15 April 2010 in a 2–2 away draw against FC Biel-Bienne. He would go to make three more appearances during the 2009–10 season though he has not made a league appearance for the club since then. Lavanchy later made his debut for Lausanne's reserve team, Team Vaud, on 17 September 2011 against FC La Tour/Le Pâquier in a 5–2 home win.

Lavanchy joined FC Lugano on 1 February 2019 until June 2021 with an option for a further year.

International career
Lavanchy is a Switzerland youth international having played at both under-17 and under-18 level. In 2010 represented Switzerland at the UEFA Under-17 European Championship.

Honours
Lausanne-Sport
Swiss Challenge League: 2010–11, 2015–16

Lugano
Swiss Cup: 2021–22

References

External links
 
 

1993 births
Living people
Swiss men's footballers
Association football midfielders
Switzerland youth international footballers
FC Lausanne-Sport players
FC Le Mont players
Grasshopper Club Zürich players
FC Lugano players
Swiss Super League players
Swiss Challenge League players
People from Morges
Sportspeople from the canton of Vaud